The 2019 Challenge Cup known as the Coral Challenge Cup for sponsorship reasons, is the 118th staging of the Challenge Cup, the main rugby league knockout tournament for teams in the Super League, the British National Leagues and a number of invited amateur clubs.

The defending champions were Catalans Dragons, who beat Warrington Wolves 20–14 at Wembley Stadium on 25 August 2018, to become the first non-British team to win the challenge cup in its 117-year history.
However, they were eliminated in the quarter finals after a 51–8 defeat, away to Hull F.C.

The format of the competition will be eight knock-out rounds followed by the final. The  final will be held on the August bank holiday weekend, and from 2020 the final will move to July, but will still be played at Wembley Stadium. The day of the final will see three matches played back-to-back, with the Challenge Cup final being preceded by the Steven Mullaney Memorial Match (the RFL Champion Schools Final for Year 7s), and the final of the newly announced 1895 Cup for clubs in the Championship and League 1.

A new sponsorship deal was announced in January 2019, with Coral replacing Ladbrokes (although both are part of the Ladbrokes Coral group).

Round details

*Toulouse Olympique and Toronto Wolfpack declined to participate in the competition.

Entry
Entry into the Cup is mandatory for the English and Welsh professional teams, but is by invitation for all other clubs, either professional or amateur. French side Toulouse declined to enter for 2019, after also declining to play in the 2018 competition. Canadian side Toronto Wolfpack also declined to enter for 2019, after both clubs were presented with a demand by the Rugby Football League (RFL) for roughly £750,000 (€830,000; C$1,226,000 approximately) as a bond insurance against reduced ticket sales, if either team reached the final.

In January 2019 it was revealed that defending champions, Catalans Dragons, had also been asked to pay a £500,000 (€553,000) bond to enter the competition.  Catalans informed the RFL, that the club had no intention of paying, leading to the possibility, that for the first time ever, the competition would take place without the defending champions being in the tournament. However, after settling their dispute with the RFL, it was confirmed that they would be defending their title.

The first and second rounds of the competition are competed for solely by amateur teams, and for 2019, 51 British based teams are joined by Serbian side Red Star in the draw for the first round of the cup. Red Star's entry is on condition that they play away from home in the first and second rounds (assuming victory in the first round). The 51 amateur clubs are 47 British teams together with four teams representing the armed forces and the British police. This season will be the first since the 1990s, that no student sides will be playing in the competition.

First round
The draw was made on 14 December 2018 at Headingley Rugby Stadium and was streamed live on the BBC Sport website. The home teams were drawn by Leeds Rhinos Women captain Lois Forsell and the away teams by Bradford Bulls coach John Kear.  Ties are to be played over the weekend of 26/27 January 2019.

Second round

The draw was made on 28 January 2019 at Wigan St Patricks and was streamed live on the BBC Sport website. The home teams were drawn by Leigh Centurions captain Mickey Higham and the away teams by Wigan Warriors halfback George Williams.  Ties are to be played over the weekend of 9–10 February 2019.

Third round
The draw for the third round was made at St Mary's Guildhall, Coventry on 11 February and shown live on the BBC Sport website.  The draw was made by Coventry born athletes Kare Adenegan and David Moorcroft.  During the draw ball number six (Haydock) was announced wrongly as number nine (Lock Lane) and vice versa.  The RFL later confirmed that the draw would be as the balls drawn and not as they were announced.

Fourth round
The draw for the fourth round was made at Odsal Stadium, home of the Bradford Bulls on 12 March and shown live on the BBC Sport website. The draw was made by former Bradford player Robbie Hunter-Paul and Simon Foster, son of former player Trevor Foster.

Fifth round
The fifth round ties were drawn on 1 April and shown live on BBC Sport.  The home teams were drawn by Linzi Prescott (widow of Steve Prescott) and the away teams by Martin Offiah.  Ties will be played over the weekend of 11–14 April.

Sixth round
The draw for the sixth round was made on 15 April 2019. Originally planned to be shown live on the BBC News Channel, the coverage was displaced due to ongoing coverage of the Notre-Dame de Paris fire and instead was restricted to live streaming on the BBC Sport website. The home teams were drawn by Paul Sculthorpe and the away teams by Jon Wilkin. Ties will be played over the weekend of 10–12 May.

Broadcasts of matches changed from on-line only to mainstream TV at this stage, with BBC and Sky Sports each televising two ties.  BBC One will show the first competitive meeting of West Yorkshire rivals Bradford Bulls and Leeds Rhinos on Saturday 11 May. On Sunday 12 May, BBC One will show the repeat of the 2018 Super League Grand Final between Wigan Warriors and Warrington Wolves.  Sky Sports will show two all-Super League ties; Hull F.C. v Castleford Tigers on Friday 10 May, and Huddersfield Giants v St. Helens on Sunday 12 May.

Quarter-finals

The draw for the Quarter finals was made on 12 May live on BBC1, directly after the televised sixth-round tie between Wigan Warriors and Warrington Wolves, with Ellery Hanley and Jonathan Davies conducting the draw. The ties will be played 30 May – 2 June.

Semi-finals

Final

Teams

Broadcasts
The primary broadcast organisation for the competition was BBC Sport. As in 2018 the BBC streamed one tie from each of the first five rounds live on the BBC Sport website with two games from the 6th, 7th, 8th rounds and the final being broadcast live on BBC TV.

See also
 2019 Women's Challenge Cup

Notes

References

External links

2019
2019 in English rugby league
2019 in Welsh rugby league
2019 in French rugby league
2019 in Scottish sport
2019 in Irish sport
2019 in Serbian sport